Federal Route 209, or Jalan Pasir Hor (formerly Kelantan State Route D3), is a federal road in Kelantan, Malaysia. The road connects Wakaf Che Yeh in the west to Kubang Kerian in the east.

Features

At most sections, the Federal Route 209 was built under the JKR R5 road standard, allowing maximum speed limit of up to 90 km/h.

List of junctions and towns

References

Malaysian Federal Roads